Trevor Michael Adams (19 May 1946 – 15 December 2000) was a British actor, best remembered for his portrayal of Tony Webster in the BBC series The Fall and Rise of Reginald Perrin (1976–79), whom he played throughout its entire run, and Alan in Fawlty Towers episode "The Wedding Party" (1975).

Adams attended the then Harold Hill Grammar School, in Harold Hill, Essex from 1957 to 1964, and played leading roles in a number of school plays. Later he trained at RADA and was a member of the National Youth Theatre. He spent a year at Stratford-Upon-Avon before turning to television, where he was often cast as a criminal. He had roles in the films Groupie Girl (1970) and Private Road (1971), and appeared in a variety of programmes in Britain, notably Public Eye, The Professionals, Z-Cars, The New Avengers and Dixon of Dock Green.

Adams left the acting profession in 1982, before moving to Norwich and retraining as a solicitor. His workload prevented him from appearing in the 1996 follow-up to The Fall and Rise of Reginald Perrin, entitled The Legacy of Reginald Perrin.

Adams died after a lengthy battle with cancer.

Filmography

Film

Television

References

External links
 

1946 births
2000 deaths
English male television actors
20th-century English male actors
Alumni of RADA
English male stage actors
National Youth Theatre members
Deaths from cancer in the United Kingdom